The Rape of Purnima Rani Shil refers to the rape of Purnima Rani Shil, then a child, during post-election violence against Awami League supporters and religious minorities.

Background 
In 2001, Bangladesh Nationalist Party and Bangladesh Jamaat-e-Islami led coalition won the general election replacing Awami League. This change led to the 2001 Bangladesh post-election violence, during which Awami League supporters and members of religious minorities were targeted by activists of Bangladesh Nationalist Party and Bangladesh Jamaat-e-Islami. Purnima was targeted as she was a polling agent of Awami League and she had also protested ballot stuffing by Bangladesh Nationalist Party activists during the election.

History 
Shil was a 12-year-old girl in Perba Delua in Ullahpara Upazila, Sirajganj District when her home was attacked by 30-40 men on 8 October 2001. She was gang raped. Four people, associated with Bangladesh Nationalist Party and Bangladesh Jamaat-e-Islami, were arrested but never charged. Her sister lost her eyesight and her family business, a saloon, was looted twice. Her family was forced to flee the village. This was part of a systematic attack on Hindu villages to drive them out of Bangladesh by radical Islamists and Bangladesh Jamaat-e-Islami. She was bought to Dhaka at the initiative of Waheedul Haq and Shahriar Kabir, who arranged for her treatment in Dhaka.

The trial started after Awami League returned to power. On 4 May 2011, 11 men were sentenced to Life imprisonment over their involved in the rape of Shil. They were also fined 100 thousand taka each. Six of the convicts are in custody while 5 remain on the run. Shil was not happy with the verdict as she believed at least two of the accused, from her village, should have been sentenced to death.

Shil received financial support from Prime Minister Sheikh Hasina, leader of Awami League, for her education. After completing her education she worked as a music tutor in Dhaka. Before that she worked briefly in a TV station but had to quit in the face of harassment on Facebook. She had been socially ostracised and faced  widespread abuse on social media.

In 2018, Shil became the personal officer of Tarana Halim, State Minister of Information. On 16 January 2019, she bought nomination papers from Awami League with the aim of becoming a member of parliament from women's reserved seat. She is a member of Awami League's Agriculture and Cooperative Sub-Committee.

In popular culture 
Shil was shown in a video titled "Didi you do not love us", which was a campaign video of Bharatiya Janata Party during the 2021 West Bengal Legislative Assembly election. The video showed violence against minorities in Bangladesh, Islamic extremists in the Middle East, and cattle smuggling in the Bangladesh-India border.

References 

2001 crimes in Bangladesh
October 2001 events in Bangladesh
Child sexual abuse in Bangladesh
History of Bangladesh (1971–present)
Rape in Bangladesh
Incidents of violence against girls
Awami League politicians